Blood Ties is a Canadian television series based on the Blood Books by Tanya Huff; the show was created by Peter Mohan. It is set in Toronto, Ontario, and features a 4-and-a-half century old vampire, Henry Fitzroy, assisting private investigator Vicki Nelson in dealing with crime committed via paranormal elements, a similar premise to an earlier series also set in Toronto, Forever Knight. It premiered in the United States on March 11, 2007, on Lifetime Television, and during fall of 2007 on City and Space in Canada. In May 2008, Lifetime declined to renew the series.

Plot
Blood Ties, set in Toronto, Ontario, centres on Vicki Nelson (Christina Cox), a former Toronto Police Service officer who left the force to become a private investigator when her eyesight begins to degenerate from retinopathia pigmentosa. Through her work she teams up with the 470-year-old vampire Henry Fitzroy, who happens to be the illegitimate son of Henry VIII. The mutual attraction between them is complicated by Vicki's relationship with former partner and lover Mike Celluci. In the beginning, he does not believe in the supernatural and thinks that Vicki is losing her mind along with her eyesight. Also in the picture is Vicki's assistant Coreen, who was hired because of her knowledge of the occult and to keep her quiet about Henry. Coreen is thoroughly enamored of both the occult and Henry, which can get her into trouble.

Cast

Main
 Christina Cox as Victoria "Vicki" Nelson
 Kyle Schmid as Henry Fitzroy
 Dylan Neal as Mike Celluci
 Gina Holden as Coreen Fennel

Recurring
 Françoise Yip as Kate Lam
 Nimet Kanji as Dr. Rajani Mohadevan
 Keith Dallas as Dave Graham
 Eileen Pedde as Allison Crowley
 Linda Sorensen as Dr. Betty Sagara

Guest stars
 Norman Bridewell  (Michael Eklund)
 Greg the doorman (Jody Racicot)
 Astaroth (John Mann)
 Ian Reddick (Juan Riedinger)
 Demon (Mark Oliver)
 Goth Bartender (Nickolas Baric)
 Salonera (Patricia Isaac)
 Magaera (Monique Ganderton)
 Javier Mendoza (Julian Sands)
 Paul 'Dirty' Deeds (Steve Bacic)
 Chuntao Fang (Kira Clavell)
 Christina (Laura Mennell)
 Lexia (Jody Thompson)
 Wynter (Olivia Sonya Cheng)

Characters
 Victoria "Vicki" Nelson Former police officer, turned private investigator. After being diagnosed with retinitis pigmentosa, Vicki faced the hard choice of leaving Homicide Division in the police department and working a desk job or leaving the police force altogether. Despite strong protests from her partner and lover, Detective Mike Celluci, she decided to leave the force and open a private investigation firm.
Though her vision does prove to be a problem at times, Vicki refuses to let anyone treat her like she is disabled and continues to take risks with her life throughout the course of her investigations. As a result of leaving the force, her relationship with Celluci has become on-again/off-again. Meanwhile, her growing attraction to Henry only fuels the complications in her love life, putting her in the center of a supernatural love triangle.
  Henry Fitzroy (b. June 15, 1519 d. June 18, 1536 reborn June 19, 1536) Based on the historical character Henry FitzRoy, 1st Duke of Richmond and Somerset - the illegitimate son of Henry VIII of England, Henry Fitzroy chose love over familial duty and sacrificed his mortal life to remain forever with the woman he loved; Christina.  Vampiric circumstances, however, prevented him from remaining with her and now, after 470 years of existence, he is living in Toronto as a graphic novelist (a.k.a. comic book artist)- "Art and literature have always been my passions.  I finally found a medium where I could fully realize the both of them."  His quiet, hidden life takes on a new twist when he collides with Vicki Nelson in an attempt to stop a man from bringing the demon Asteroth into the mortal world. As they work to solve this case, and subsequently other supernatural problems, Henry grows deeply attracted to Vicki's willful nature and exuberance for life, eventually falling for her. Though she seems to resist his advances, he continues to pursue her and, mostly due to his centuries of experience and knowledge of both sides of the supernatural, he becomes Vicki's partner and bodyguard.
 Detective Mike Celluci Vicki's former partner, as well as on/off lover, he was very much against her decision to leave the force. He and Vicki share many personality traits, which often results in arguments between the two. Yet despite (or perhaps because of) this they are firm friends, both going so far as to discuss their current cases. As straight as they come, and a "see it to believe it" kind of guy to boot, Mike often exhibits concern over the kind of cases Vicki seems willing to take on in her new career. He has trouble accepting Vicki's friendship and trust in Henry, even more so once he finds out what Henry is, often coming across as jealous. However, they have been known to work together on occasion - especially when it is Vicki who needs help.
 Coreen Fennel Coreen becomes known to Vicki during her first "unusual" case, hiring her to find out who killed her boyfriend. Once the case was over, she managed to insinuate herself into the position of Vicki's office assistant. Coreen appears to have extensive knowledge about the occult, and is certainly far more curious and accepting of it than any of the other characters. Because of this, she seems to have struck up a friendship with Dr. Sagara, a professor of the occult known to Henry, and the two can occasionally be seen working together on a case for Vicki. Coreen can at times serve as an emissary between Vicki and Mike, usually trying to get Vicki talking with him again. It was shown various times that she may have a crush on Henry, most prominently when first meeting him. However, when the two rarely work together, Coreen's lingering looks may suggest that she has a crush on him or it may be the way Henry naturally attracts women. This character does not appear in the books beyond the "client" role she originated in the first episode, and it has been suggested that she "replaced" the character of Tony. Several sources cite the omission of Tony as being due to copyright reasons in that the rights to the series of books that feature Tony are owned by another network. Fan sites claim that there were aspects of Tony's free-spirited, reformed street hustler character that might have proved offensive or unsettling to the general viewing public.

Episodes

Season 1 (2007)

Season 2 (2007)

International airings
The series has been bought by UK channel Living and started airing there on August 16, 2007. In 2008 the show commenced screening in Australia on the FOX8 channel. In Spain, it is broadcast by Calle 13 and started on November 22, 2007.  In Latin America the series has started to run on AXN, but later changed to Animax the anime and SciFi Channel part of Sony Entertainment (as AXN). It is also broadcast in 2012 on French channel NRJ 12.

Reception
Common Sense Media rated the series 3 out of 5 stars.

Home media

Smoke and Mirrors
In April 2010, it was announced that The Fremantle Corporation and Kaleidoscope Entertainment are developing a new vampire series, "Smoke & Mirrors," based on the "Smoke" book series by Canadian fantasy author Tanya Huff.
Kaleidoscope in 2007 turned Huff's "Blood" book series into the Lifetime Television series "Blood Ties," which also aired in Canada on Citytv and Space.
Fremantle and Kaleidoscope are now shopping "Smoke & Mirrors," starting at MIPTV, as a possible Canadian-European co-production. The urban fantasy series will see the return of Henry Fitzroy, the 474-year-old vampire, in a series of paranormal misadventures experienced on a fictional TV series shoot.

The "Smoke" book series is a sequel to Huff's "Blood" book, in which the characters are Tony Foster (character replaced by Coreen in Blood Ties) and Henry Fitzroy, dedicated to solving mysteries and combating supernatural threats.

See also

Vampire film
List of vampire television series

References

External links

2000s Canadian drama television series
2007 Canadian television series debuts
2007 Canadian television series endings
Canadian horror fiction television series
Citytv original programming
English-language television shows
Lifetime (TV network) original programming
CTV Sci-Fi Channel original programming
Vampire detective shows
Vampires in television
Television shows filmed in Vancouver
Television shows set in Toronto